Stephanie Rovetti (born October 2, 1991) is an American rugby player. Rovetti was a basketball player in college and began playing rugby at age 24, after maxing out her NCAA eligibility for basketball.

Personal life
Rovetti attended Reno High School and graduated in 2010. After high school, she graduated from BYU with B.S. in public health in 2014 and from California State University, Fresno with an MPA in Public Administration in 2016. She is currently the Director of Operations for the University of San Diego basketball team.

References

External links 
 Profile at USA Rugby
 
 

1991 births
Living people
American female rugby union players
United States women's international rugby union players
Brigham Young University alumni
American female rugby sevens players
Pan American Games medalists in rugby sevens
Pan American Games silver medalists for the United States
Rugby sevens players at the 2019 Pan American Games
Medalists at the 2019 Pan American Games